Gregor Ebner (24 June 1892 – 22 March 1974) was a medical doctor from Kirchseeon near Munich. During the time of Nazi Germany he served as the medical leader of all the Lebensborn Homes.

Life
Ebner was born in Ichenhausen to Gregor Ebner, a coffee-house proprietor and his wife Marie (née Maurer). From 1914 to 1918 he took part in World War I as an Army Field Doctor. Thereafter he spent a few months with the Freikorps Epp. Following his graduation from medical school in June 1920 he opened a medical practice in Kirchseeon. In 1930 he became a member of the National Socialist German Workers' Party (NSDAP), commonly referred to in English as the Nazi Party (Membership number 340.925). He immediately became the Town Group Leader and Deputy Regional Leader. In 1931 he joined the General SS. Ebner met Heinrich Himmler in 1930 and was his house doctor for many years.

In mid-1937 Ebner gave up his private practice and joined the Lebensborn Association full time. He remained in the function of medical head of all the Lebensborn run homes. In addition, he was the Chairman of the Disciplinary Court of the National Socialist Doctor's League 'from 1938. In 1939 he gained the rank of SS-Oberführer.

On the 10 March 1948, Ebner was only found guilty of being a member of the SS at the Nuremberg SS Race and Settlement Main Office hearing and sentenced to time served Thereafter, he continued his medical practice in Kirchseeon and Wolfratshausen.

Bibliography

References

External links
Gregor Ebner at the Jewish Virtual Library

1892 births
1974 deaths
People from Bavaria
German military doctors
Physicians in the Nazi Party
People convicted by the United States Nuremberg Military Tribunals